Corendon Airlines (incorporated as Turistik Hava Taşımacılık A.Ş.) is a Turkish leisure airline headquartered in Antalya and based at Antalya Airport.

Corendon Airlines is a part of Corendon Tourism Group.

History
Corendon Airlines, founded in 2004 with flight operations starting in April 2005, is an international airline transporting approximately 6 million travelers each year. The Dutch sister company Corendon Dutch Airlines was founded in 2011 and the Maltese sister company Corendon Airlines Europe was founded in 2017.

Destinations
as of March 2023, Corendon Airlines serves the following destinations shown here.

Fleet

The Corendon Airlines current fleet consists of the following aircraft as of July 22, 2022:

Accidents and incidents
On 2 October 2010 a Boeing 737-400 of Corendon Airlines overran runway 22 at Amsterdam Schiphol Airport and ended up with its nose gear in the mud after a flight from Dalaman.

On 14 October 2012 Corendon Airlines Flight 733, a Boeing 737-800 operating between Antalya and Trondheim suffered a hull loss after the plane caught fire during pushback from the gate. 27 passengers were injured during the evacuation. The cause was determined to be a short circuit in the captain's cockpit panel near an oxygen tank.

References

External links

2004 establishments in Turkey
Airlines of Turkey
Airlines established in 2004
Charter airlines